The Impatient Romantic is an album by Hunter Valentine released in 2007, with "Typical", "Staten Island Dream Tour" and "Break This" released as singles.

Track listing

References

2007 debut albums
Hunter Valentine albums
True North Records albums